Minervarya brevipalmata (common names: short-webbed frog, Peters' frog, and Pegu wart frog) is a species of frog found in the Western Ghats in southern India (Maharashtra, Tamil Nadu, and Kerala states). M. brevipalmata is a little-known and uncommon grassland frog associated with waterlogged or marshy areas, but it has also been recorded from suitable wet patches of forest and lightly degraded former forest.

References

External links

brevipalmata
Frogs of India
Endemic fauna of the Western Ghats
Amphibians described in 1871
Taxa named by Wilhelm Peters
Taxobox binomials not recognized by IUCN